Alpha,alpha-trehalose-phosphate synthase may refer to:
 Alpha,alpha-trehalose-phosphate synthase (GDP-forming)
 Alpha,alpha-trehalose-phosphate synthase (UDP-forming)